The 1991 Texas Longhorns football team represented the University of Texas at Austin during the 1991 NCAA Division I-A football season. They were represented in the Southwest Conference. They played their home games at Texas Memorial Stadium in Austin, Texas. The team was led by head coach David McWilliams.

Schedule

Roster
QB Peter Gardere, RS Jr.
QB RJO, RS Fr .

References

Texas
Texas Longhorns football seasons
Texas Longhorns football